Toomas Kandimaa (born 19 June 1975) is an Estonian basketball coach and former professional player who is currently the head coach for University of Tartu of the Korvpalli Meistriliiga. Kandimaa represented the Estonian national basketball team internationally.

Estonian national team
As a member of the Estonian national team, Kandimaa competed at the EuroBasket 1993 and the EuroBasket 2001.

References

External links
 Toomas Kandimaa at basket.ee 
 Toomas Kandimaa at fiba.com

People from Elva, Estonia
Estonian men's basketball players
Small forwards
University of Tartu basketball team players
Korvpalli Meistriliiga players
BC Valga players
1975 births
Living people